Hodonín is a town in the South Moravian Region of the Czech Republic. It has about 24,000 inhabitants.

Administrative parts
Hodonín is made up of only one administrative part.

Geography
It lies in a flat landscape of the Lower Morava Valley. It is situated on the right bank of the Morava River, which forms here the Czech-Slovak border. The western municipal border is formed by the Kyjovka River, which supplies a set of eight ponds.

History
The castle in Hodonín was founded sometime in the 11th century. However, the document from 1046 which was the oldest mention of the castle, is demonstrably a forgery.

The first written credible mention of Hodonín is from 1169. In 1228 it became a town. During the Thirty Years' War the town was severely damaged and the population decreased. In the 18th century a local castle was rebuilt to a tobacco factory, whose production helped repopulate the town. The railway to Hodonín was built in 1841, and extended to Holíč in 1891.

The northern part of the municipal territory, especially the hamlet of Pánov, retirement home and the Hodonín Zoo, was severely damaged by the 2021 South Moravia tornado.

Demographics

Economy
In the vicinity of the town there is an oil field and a stratum of lignite, which was formerly transported to the town of Otrokovice, a few kilometers from the city of Zlín, by the Baťa Canal, which was built by the Czech entrepreneur Tomáš Baťa and now operates as a tourist attraction.

The largest industrial employers based in the town are MND (oil and gas producer) and Delimax (manufacturer of delicatessen and fish products).

Transport
There is a road border crossing and a railway border crossing, leading to neighbouring Holíč.

Sights

The main sights are the Church of Saint Lawrence and the town hall, both located on the town square. The church is originally a Gothic structure from the first half of the 13th century, baroque rebuilt in 1780–1786. The town hall was built in the Art Nouveau style in 1902–1904, by architect Ernst von Gotthilf in 1902–1904. Its tower is open to the public as a lookout tower.

The Hodonín Zoo was founded in 1977 and it is one of the smallest and youngest zoos in the country.

Notable people
Tomáš Garrigue Masaryk (1850–1937), politician, the first president of Czechoslovakia
Henry Kučera (1925–2010), linguist and pioneer of computer linguistics
Václav Nedomanský (born 1944), ice hockey player
Zdeněk Škromach (born 1956), politician
Karel Komárek (born 1969), entrepreneur and philanthropist
Dana Čechová (born 1983), table tennis player
Vítězslav Veselý (born 1983), javelin thrower
Michal Kempný (born 1990), ice hockey player

Twin towns – sister cities

Hodonín is twinned with:
 Holíč, Slovakia
 Jasło, Poland
 Skalica, Slovakia
 Trebišov, Slovakia
 Zistersdorf, Austria

References

External links

 

 
Cities and towns in the Czech Republic
Populated places in Hodonín District
Moravian Slovakia